Nassarius granifer, common name the granulated dog whelk or granulated nassa, is a species of sea snail with an operculum, a marine gastropod mollusc in the family Nassariidae, the mud snails or dog whelks.

Description
The length of the shell of this species varies between 10 mm and 18 mm.

The shell is rather small, ovate, thick and globular. Its color is of an ash-white. The spire is  conical and, pointed, composed of six whorls, the lowest much larger than all the other. This body whorl presents on its surface conical, distant tubercles, disposed in four series. A few transverse striae ornament the base. The upper whorls have only a single row of tubercles. The ovate aperture is narrow, emarginated at the upper part, at its union with the outer lip, which is thick, striated internally. The columella is arcuated, covering the inner lip, which is expanded into a white, thick callosity, covering the whole lower surface, and a portion of the upper whorls.

Distribution
The shell occurs in the Indo-West Pacific Ocean off Réunion, Aldabra, Chagos, Mascarene Basin. Specimens of this species were gathered by Rizal in Dapitan in 1894 although he labeled them as Nassa arcularia; also off many islands in Oceania and off Australia (New South Wales, Northern Territory, Queensland).

References

 Bruguière, J.G. 1789. Buccinum. Encyclopédie Méthodique ou par de matieres. Historie Naturelle des Vers et Mollusques 1: 236-285
 Marrat, F.P. 1880. On the varieties of the shells belonging to the genus Nassa Lam. 104 pp.
 Cernohorsky W. O. (1984). Systematics of the family Nassariidae (Mollusca: Gastropoda). Bulletin of the Auckland Institute and Museum 14: 1-356
 Cernohorsky, W.O. 1991. Mollusca Gastropoda: On a collection of Nassariidae from New Caledonian waters. Bulletin du Muséum National d'Histoire Naturelle. Section A. Zoologie. Series A Zoologie, Tome 150 7: 187-204
 Wilson, B. 1994. Australian Marine Shells. Prosobranch Gastropods. Kallaroo, WA : Odyssey Publishing Vol. 2 370 pp.
 Marais J.P. & Kilburn R.N. (2010) Nassariidae. pp. 138–173, in: Marais A.P. & Seccombe A.D. (eds), Identification guide to the seashells of South Africa. Volume 1. Groenkloof: Centre for Molluscan Studies. 376 pp.

External links
 

 

Nassariidae
Gastropods described in 1834